Prof. John Share Jones , known as Dr Share Jones (25 August 1873 – 2 December 1950), was a British veterinary surgeon and briefly a Liberal Party politician.

Personal life
Jones was born John Thomas Jones, in Cefn Mawr, Denbighshire, the son of Thomas Jones, a farmer, and his wife, Mary Ann. His mother's maiden name was Share, and Jones adopted this into his own name later in life.

Jones was educated at the University of Liverpool, King’s College (proxime accessit Logic Prize), University College, the Royal Veterinary College, London (Centenary Prizeman, etc.) and Paris. He married Dr Mary S. Jones of Wrexham and lived at Pentre Bychan Hall near Wrexham, before later moving to live at Plas Kynaston Hall, Cefn Mawr. In 1948 he was awarded the MBE.

Veterinary career
Jones graduated from the Royal Veterinary College, London in 1900, becoming a Member of the Royal College of Veterinary Surgeons. Jones joined the veterinary faculty at the University of Liverpool when it first opened in October 1914.

For the year 1928–29, Jones was President of the Royal College of Veterinary Surgeons. He retired from the University of Liverpool in 1939, whereupon the university bestowed on him the title of Emeritus Professor. Jones's unpublished biography is held at the university.

Political career
Jones was Liberal candidate for the Oswestry division of Shropshire at the 1929 General Election. Oswestry was a safe Unionist seat where the Liberals usually finished second. He achieved a swing of 8.2%, but it was not enough to win the seat;

He did not stand for parliament again. He was selected as a Liberal Party prospective parliamentary candidate for the neighbouring constituency of Shrewsbury sometime after 1935 and was active there in anticipation of a general election expected to take place in 1939/1940. As it transpired, due to the outbreak of war, the election did not take place until 1945, by which time he had been replaced as Liberal candidate.

Publications
 
Surgical Veterinary Anatomy, in 4 volumes 1904–1914:
 
Superficial Anatomy of the Limbs, 1906
 
 
 
 
 
Higher Agricultural Education in Wales, 1914
The Education of the Veterinary Student, Brussels, 1919
Local Health Authorities and Animal Diseases, Bordeaux, 1924
Veterinary Science, 1910–1925
The Encyclopædia Britannica
Animal Husbandry and Public Health, with a plea for a National System of Live Stock Insurance, Ghent, 1927
The Relationship of the Veterinary Surgeon to Animal Husbandry, International Veterinary Congress, 1930
The Domestic Animals in relation to our Food and Industries, 1935
Settlement on the Land—Der Ausweg, Paris
Wales and the Animal Industry
formerly Editor Veterinary Student and Editor-in-chief Veterinary News

References

External links
 

Members of the Order of the British Empire
British veterinarians
Liberal Party (UK) parliamentary candidates
Alumni of the University of Liverpool
1873 births
1950 deaths